Baroda is another common name for the city of Vadodara in Gujarat, India.

Baroda may also refer to:

Baroda Residency, which acceded to India in 1947
Baroda State, a former Indian princely state in modern-day Gujarat
Baroda, Michigan, USA
Baroda Township, Michigan, USA
Baroda, Minnesota, USA
Baroda, the Ghost Hunter, a fictional character created by Sharadindu Bandyopadhyay